is an action-adventure hack and slash shooter video game developed by Valhalla Game Studios and published by Nintendo for the Wii U. The Wii U version was released in most regions in August 2015, and later in North America in December 2015. An online multiplayer-only version for Windows, titled Devil's Third Online, was released in collaboration with Korean publisher Nexon in Japan in June 2016. The Windows version also supports voice-chat, which the Wii U version lacks. Despite receiving positive reviews in Japan, the Wii U version received negative reviews internationally upon release.

Gameplay
While the camera is usually set to follow Ivan, the player character, the camera shifts into a first person perspective when aiming. Unlike many modern third-person shooters, it does not adopt an over-the-shoulder approach, instead opting for a more traditional camera that is directly behind the character, save for when ducking behind cover. Melee combat consists of chaining together a series of attacks, often followed with a cinematic takedown. In addition, melee weapons can be swapped, thrown at enemies, and stolen mid-counter.

It features online play and a means of reshaping the battlefield via a sort of level editor. It features three types of progression currency: Clan Funds, Dollen, and Golden Eggs. Among choosing sides in game modes, there is a third side known as the "Free Entry" option, which is said to be the option that would appeal to the Lone Wolf type of player. It isn't clear as to what this actually does, but it is implied that "Free Entry" players fight as a third force that does not contribute to either team. On December 29, 2016, at 1PM Japan Standard Time, Nintendo shut down the servers for the Wii U version of Devil's Third.

Plot

The game's backstory is based on the Kessler syndrome theory. Debris from artificial satellites in orbit has created a cascading effect of collisions, leading to the destruction of nearly all satellites, both civilian and military. In the resulting turmoil, war erupts around the world as the balance of military power is thrown into chaos. Infantry battle is altered in a world without satellite technology. It can be seen from concept art that the game will be taking place around the world with Asian and American locations.

Development
Devil's Third was the first video game produced by Valhalla Game Studios, a company founded in 2008 by former Tecmo staff including Tomonobu Itagaki. The game was slated to be a departure from Itagaki's previous genres, hack and slash and fighting games.

Devil's Third began life as an intended Xbox 360 exclusive to be published by Microsoft Game Studios. After the partnership fell through, Itagaki met with Danny Bilson, then employed at THQ, who would share his vision of the title and agreed to publish it for PlayStation 3, Xbox 360 and PC. However, THQ would eventually be forced to drop publishing for the title following their bankruptcy in 2013, leaving Valhalla Game Studios without a partner to release the game with. Unlike other THQ intellectual property, which was sold to other publishers, the rights to Devil's Third were given back to Valhalla Game Studios. Despite the bankruptcy of THQ, Danny Bilson continued to act as a creative consultant on the title "until the very end".

Following the lack of THQ support, Valhalla Game Studios would partner with South Korean company Doobic to produce and publish the title. The Doobic partnership also promised a multi-platform release, including mobile platforms and PCs; however, Doobic eventually went out of business, setting back the development of Devil's Third even further, and leaving Valhalla Game Studios again to try and find a partner. The setbacks caused by the collapse of both THQ and Doobic landed the game in development hell for several years.

During this time, Valhalla Game Studios CEO Satoshi Kanematsu approached then-Nintendo president Satoru Iwata, who agreed to publish the title for Wii U. Itagaki stated that Nintendo published Devil's Third because "they don't have enough strong online games", and that it wasn't "a game that Nintendo could make internally, so we came in as their mercenaries to make a strong online game." Devil's Third was re-revealed as a Wii U exclusive at E3 2014 via IGN following Nintendo's E3 Digital Event and released the following year.

Devil's Third switched engines during its development, as the company responsible for making its original engine closed down. Since that time, Valhalla Game Studios had continued development using an adaptation of video game developer Relic Entertainment's engine. Although a version of Devil's Third for the Wii U was not confirmed at the time, Itagaki reported that the game would run perfectly fine on the system. Devil's Third now uses Unreal Engine 3 as the main game engine.

On June 23, Nintendo announced that the online portion on the Wii U version will be discontinued on December 28, 2016, only 16 months after the game's initial release.

North American release 
Despite anticipation, and prior confirmation of the Japanese and European region release dates, the game was not featured at E3 2015 however, and prior to this its Nintendo eShop listing disappeared without explanation.

It was later revealed by gaming news outlet Siliconera that Nintendo of America decided not to publish the game, although the game is still confirmed for North American release. However, an alternative publisher was not announced at that point. While no official reasons were given, game journalist Liam Robertson, whom originally tipped the public about Nintendo of America dropping publishing duties for Devil's Third, stated the subsidiary "lost faith" in the title, similar to the Wii title Disaster: Day of Crisis, which never saw a North American release. Robertson claims this information comes from an anonymous insider source while investigating the development of the cancelled Wii title Project H.A.M.M.E.R.. On July 11, 2015, Nintendo of America revealed that they would be sharing more information in regards to Devil's Third soon, but did not state whether or not they would be publishing the title in North America. Multiple sources had reported to Nintendo Life and Nintendo World Report that Nintendo of America did indeed drop publishing duties but had since reconsidered due to backlash against the decision.

On July 21, Nintendo of America officially announced they are publishing Devil's Third in the region, releasing the title in the fourth quarter of 2015. They also announced that the multiplayer mode of the game would be released on the PC from Valhalla as a free-to-play game, albeit in limited form by comparison. Unlike Nintendo of Europe, Nintendo of America did not send advance review copies to journalists. They could only begin reviewing once the game goes on sale. The game also saw a limited retail release in the region, as GameStop only received 420 copies to sell on their online store for the entire U.S. Despite low expectations, retail copies were already sold out in most American chains. EBay vendors began selling factory-new copies of the game for very high prices.

Reception

Pre-release
Early previews for the single player campaign were mixed, with most complaints being the game's poor graphics, heavily inconsistent framerate, stiff aiming, and input lag. Despite negative reception, designer Itagaki thought that the game would be a "breakthrough for the industry", and that it would elevate the genre to a new level.

Post-release
The game received a mostly positive reception in Japan. Japanese magazine Famitsu gave the game a score of 33/40, with four individual reviewers scoring it 8, 9, 8 and 8 out of 10. Since the game was exclusive to Amazon in Japan, sales weren't available for tracking, but the game received a mostly positive reception from users.

In contrast to its original Japanese release, the international release of Devil's Third received negative reviews. It received an aggregated score of 43/100 on review aggregator Metacritic based on 54 reviews. Overall, praise was given to the game's design, gameplay and multiplayer elements, while most panned the game's campaign, controls, graphics, and inconsistent framerate. Nintendo Life gave Devil's Third 5/10 summarising that "Devil's Third is tricky to recommend, ultimately. There's undoubted fun to be had online, but at the same time this is an action game that sells Wii U gamers short. It's packed with good intentions and ambition, but Valhalla Game Studios was unable to execute its vision well enough. The devil is in the detail, and that's the problem". Sean Bell from GameSpot rated the game 3/10, praising multiplayer modes and occasional comedic moments, but heavily criticizing microtransactions in multiplayer, clunky controls and technical issues. Kirk McKeand of Digital Spy gave the game just 1/5 stating "Devil's Third is an offensively bad - sometimes actually offensive - action game, with sub-standard melee combat and fiddly gunplay. Riddled with technical issues, it's almost completely devoid of any redeeming qualities. It also has killer bats". IGN gave it a 3.5 out of 10, praising the game for mixing gunplay and melee combat, but criticized the game's poor presentation, simple and repetitive combat, random damage spikes, and pay to win multiplayer, calling it "an exercise in cynicism, a video game seemingly created for people who secretly hate them. There’s barely even a seed of a good idea here, let alone a fully formed one. There isn’t a single part of Devil’s Third that does not feel as though it were ripped straight from a decade-old playbook, and its nihilistic reliance on simplistic violence reinforces that fact with every severed limb."

The game was placed on Polygon's "Worst Video Games of 2015" list. Similarly, it was also placed on GameSpot's "Worst Reviewed Games of 2015" list.

Sales 
The game failed to make the UK Top 40 sales charts in its first week on sale in the region. The game is rumored to have sold only 3,000 copies in North America in its first month of release in the region, however limited retail copies were available at launch.

Possible sequel
In an interview with Polygon, Itagaki stated that his team is interested in doing a sequel and stated that Devil's Third was envisioned as a trilogy.

References

External links
 
 Official Japanese Website
 

2015 video games
Action-adventure games
Apocalyptic video games
Cancelled PlayStation 3 games
Cancelled Xbox 360 games
Hack and slash games
Multiplayer and single-player video games
Nintendo Network games
Nintendo games
Shooter video games
Terrorism in fiction
Video games about the United States Marine Corps
Unreal Engine games
Video games developed in Japan
Video games scored by Mike Reagan
Video games set in Cuba
Video games set in Dallas
Video games set in Mexico
Video games set in New York City
Video games set in Panama
Wii U eShop games
Wii U games
Fiction about the United States Army
Windows games
Video games about zombies
Products and services discontinued in 2016
War video games
War video games
Inactive multiplayer online games